Xiaying District is a rural district of about 22,825 residents in Tainan, Taiwan.

History
After the handover of Taiwan from Japan to the Republic of China in 1945, Xiaying was organized as a rural township of Tainan County. On 25 December 2010, Tainan County was merged with Tainan City and Xiaying was upgraded to a district of the city.

Administrative divisions 
Xiaying, Renli, Zhainei, Houjie, Xinxing, Yingqian, Datun, Dabei, Maogang, Zhongying, Kaihua, Xilian, Hejian, Jiazhong and Hongcuo Village.

Tourist attractions 
 Sinying Sugar Plant

Notable natives 
 Chen Wei-zen, Minister of the Interior (2014–2016)
 Yen Shui-long, former painter and sculptor

References

External links 

 

Districts of Tainan